is a Japanese judoka.

She is from Mito, Ibaraki. After graduation from high school, she worked for Komatsu Limited.

She won the bronze medal in the Middleweight (70 kg) division at the 2009 World Judo Championships.

References

External links
 

Japanese female judoka
1985 births
Living people
Judoka at the 2010 Asian Games
Asian Games competitors for Japan
20th-century Japanese women
21st-century Japanese women